Lo Corrunco or El Corronco is a mountain of Catalonia, Spain. Located in the Pyrenees, it has an altitude of 2,543.3 metres above sea level.

See also
Mountains of Catalonia

References

Mountains of Catalonia
Mountains of the Pyrenees
Vall de Boí
Two-thousanders of Spain